Sharp's Oakland is a historic home located at Doswell, Hanover County, Virginia. It was built about 1890, and is a three-story, I-house frame dwelling in the Second Empire style.  It features a high mansard roof still covered with patterned wooden shingles and a simple porch with Eastlake posts.  Also on the property is a contributing slave quarter with a massive chimney.

It was listed on the National Register of Historic Places in 2002.

References

Houses on the National Register of Historic Places in Virginia
Second Empire architecture in Virginia
Houses completed in 1890
Houses in Hanover County, Virginia
National Register of Historic Places in Hanover County, Virginia